"Meet Her at the Love Parade" is a song recorded by German disc jockey Da Hool. It was released in August 1997 as the lead single from the album, Here Comes Da Hool. The song had great success in many countries, particularly in Belgium, France, Germany, Ireland, and the Netherlands, where it reached the top 10. In Iceland, the song peaked at number one. The song was released in the United Kingdom in February 1998 as the Nalin & Kane remix and reached number 15 on the UK Singles Chart. A second remix by Fergie reached number 11 on the same chart in July 2001. Mixmag included the song on their list of the "The 15 Best Mid-90s Trance Tracks" in 2018.

Content
The song references the Love Parade, a former German electronic dance music festival and parade.

Music video
Nikolas Mann directed the music video, which premiered in mid-1997.  The music video Stéphane Sednaoui directed for Björk's 1993 single "Big Time Sensuality" heavily influenced the video.

Charts

Weekly charts
Original version

2001 remix

Year-end charts
Original version

Certifications and sales

Release history

References

1997 songs
1997 singles
2001 singles
Da Hool songs
Music videos directed by Nikolas Mann
Number-one singles in Iceland